Sayn-Homburg (not to be confused with the later state of Sayn-Wittgenstein-Homburg) was a mediaeval county of Germany with its seat at Homburg Castle. It was created as a partition of Sponheim-Sayn in 1283. In 1345, Salentin, the son of Count Godfrey, married the heiress of Wittgenstein and the Counties were united and, on his death, merged  to form the County of Sayn-Wittgenstein.

Counts of Sayn-Homburg (1283–1384)
 Engelbert (1283–1336)
 Godfrey (1336–84)
To County of Sayn-Wittgenstein

1384 disestablishments
States and territories established in 1283